Andrew C. Revkin is an American science and environmental journalist, author and educator. He has written on a wide range of subjects including destruction of the Amazon rain forest, the 2004 Asian tsunami, sustainable development, climate change, and the changing environment around the North Pole. He is the founding director of the Initiative on Communication and Sustainability at The Earth Institute of Columbia University. 

Previously he was strategic adviser for environmental and science journalism at National Geographic Society. Through 2017 he was senior reporter for climate change at the independent investigative newsroom ProPublica. He was a reporter for The New York Times from 1995 through 2009. In 2007, he created the Dot Earth environmental blog for The Times. The blog moved to the Opinion Pages in 2010 and ran through 2016. From 2010 to 2016 he was also the Senior Fellow for Environmental Understanding at Pace University. He is also a performing songwriter and was a frequent accompanist of Pete Seeger.

Early life
Andrew Revkin was born and raised in Rhode Island. He graduated from Brown University in 1978 with a degree in Biology. He later received a Master's in Journalism from the Columbia University Graduate School of Journalism.

Career
Early in his career he held senior editor and senior writer positions at Discover magazine and Science Digest, respectively.

From 1995 through 2009, Revkin covered the environment for The New York Times.  In 2003, he became the first Times reporter to file stories from the North Pole area and in 2005-6 broke stories about the Bush administration's interference with scientific research, particularly at NASA.

In 2010, he joined Pace University's Academy for Applied Environmental Studies as Senior Fellow for Environmental Understanding.

Revkin has also written books on humanity's weather and climate learning journey, the once and future Arctic, the Amazon, and global warming. He was interviewed by Seed magazine about his book The North Pole Was Here, which was published in 2006. He stressed that "the hard thing to convey in print as journalists, and for society to absorb, is that this is truly a century-scale problem."

Revkin is among those credited with developing the idea that humans, through growing impacts on Earth’s climate and other critical systems, are creating a distinct geological epoch, the Anthropocene. He was a member of the "Anthropocene" Working Group from 2010 to 2016. The group is charged by a branch of the International Commission on Stratigraphy with gauging evidence that a formal change in the Geologic Time Scale is justified.

Works 
Weather: An Illustrated History, from Cloud Atlases to Climate Change. New York: Sterling, 2018, 
The North Pole Was Here: Puzzles and Perils at the Top of the World. Boston: Kingfisher, 2006, 
Global Warming: Understanding the Forecast. New York: Abbeville Press, 1992, 
The Burning Season: The Murder of Chico Mendes and the Fight for the Amazon Rain Forest. Washington, DC: Island Press, 2004 [1990], 

-- translated and published also in Spanish, French, Italian, Dutch, German, Portuguese, Japanese and Thai editions

Films based on his work 
Two films have been based on Revkin's writing:

 The Burning Season (1994), a prize-winning HBO film starring Raul Julia and directed by John Frankenheimer, was based on Revkin's eponymous biography of Chico Mendes, the slain defender of the Amazon rain forest.
 Rock Star (2001), starring Mark Wahlberg and Jennifer Aniston, was based on "A Metal-Head Becomes a Metal-God. Heavy," a 1997 New York Times article by Revkin. The article described how a singer in a Judas Priest tribute band rose to replace his idol in the real band.

Songwriter and musician 

Revkin is a multi-instrumentalist and songwriter who leads a Hudson Valley roots ensemble called Breakneck Ridge Revue. He performed frequently with Pete Seeger between 2003 and 2014 and was a member of Uncle Wade, a blues-roots band. His first album, A Very Fine Line, featuring guest contributions by Dar Williams, Mike Marshall and Bruce Molsky, was released in November, 2013.

Awards
 2021 Sigma Xi Honorary Member
 2015 American Geophysical Union, Robert C. Cowen Award for Sustained Achievement in Science Journalism
 2011 National Academy of Sciences, National Academy of Engineering, and Institute of Medicine joint National Academies Communication Award
 2008 John Chancellor Award, Columbia University
 2007-2008 Dr. Jean Mayer Global Citizenship Award, Tufts University
2007 Honorary Sol Feinstone Environmental Award, SUNY-ESF, Syracuse, NY
2006 John Simon Guggenheim Fellowship
 2003 National Academy of Sciences, National Academy of Engineering, and Institute of Medicine joint National Academies Communication Award
 2002 and 1986 American Association for the Advancement of Science (climate change, nuclear winter)
 1983 Investigative Reporters and Editors Award, for a magazine article "on the worldwide death toll from misuse of Paraquat"
 Honorary doctorate, Pace University
 His book, The North Pole Was Here, was "A Junior Library Guild selection"

References

External links

Andrew C. Revkin - Biography at the NYTimes
Revkin Videos - Revkin's YouTube channel

 
 
Video of Revkin accepting the John Chancellor Award

"9 Billion People + 1 Planet = ?" Andrew Revkin's interview with Vaclav Smil at the Quantum to Cosmos festival at Perimeter Institute for Theoretical Physics.
New York Times review of "The Burning Season."
New York Times article that inspired "Rock Star."
National Public Radio interview with Revkin about the making of "Rock Star."
"Q&A: Andrew Revkin", The Observatory December 16, 2008 Columbia Journalism Review
 Chris Hayes. Exploring the wicked problem of climate change with Andrew Revkin (Aug. 14, 2018)
 

Living people
The New York Times columnists
1956 births
American non-fiction environmental writers
Brown University alumni
Columbia University Graduate School of Journalism alumni
Columbia University faculty
Pace University faculty
Environmental journalists
Folk musicians from New York (state)
Songwriters from New York (state)
American bloggers
Environmental bloggers
Online journalists
People from Garrison, New York
Discover (magazine) people
21st-century American non-fiction writers